Shifty Records is an independent record label in the United States specializing in metal. It produces music by bands such as Boulder.

See also 
 List of record labels

External links
 Official site

American independent record labels
Heavy metal record labels